Çatalören can refer to:

 Çatalören, Bala
 Çatalören, Erzincan
 Çatalören, Karayazı